Ratanpur is a 2018 Gujarati mystery drama film starring Tushar Sadhufeatured Tushar Sadhu, Uday Dangar and Jimmy Nanda as lead characters and produced by Prolife Entertainment.

Plot 
Gaurav Sharma (Tushar Sadhu) is an honest IPS officer who is recently posted in the mysterious village of Ratanpur where he comes face to face with a case, a Murder, that's about to change his life and values forever.

Cast
 Tushar Sadhu
 Haresh Dagia 
 Uday Dangar 
 Vishal Vaishya 
 Jay Pandya 
 Dipen Raval
 Jimmy Nanda
 Sunil Vaghela 
 Jigar Bundela 
 Nirmit Vaishnav 
 Riya Subodh 
 Parmeshwar Sirsikar 
 Shivani 
 Priyanka Ashok Tiwari

Production
The film is loosely inspired by the true events. Despite challenges of shooting on location, Ratanpur is shot on location to preserve the authenticity of the setting, in Ratanpur village in Gujarat. Music is composed by  the duo Jatin-Pratik. Playback singer Sunidhi Chauhan sung songs in the film.

Release 
The film released on 16 March 2018 across Gujarat and Maharashtra.

References

External links
 

2018 films
Films shot in India
Films set in Ahmedabad
Films shot in Ahmedabad
Films shot in Gujarat
Indian mystery films
2010s Gujarati-language films
2010s mystery films